All India Institute of Medical Sciences Kalyani (AIIMS Kalyani) (IAST: Akhil Bhāratiya Āyurvignan Sangsthān Kalyani) is a Public hospital and Medical school it located in Saguna, Kalyani, West Bengal, India, and one of the AIIMS and Institutes of National Importance. Announced in 2014 and approved in 2015, construction started in 2016 and the institute started operation in 2019, one of six AIIMSs to do so in that year. The yearly MBBS intake is 125 from 2020 and selection is done through NEET(UG).

History
AIIMS Kalyani was set up as part of the Pradhan Mantri Swasthya Suraksha Yojana (PMSSY) initiative, announced by the Government of India in 2003 and officially launched in March 2006, for the purpose of "correcting regional imbalances in the availability of affordable/reliable tertiary healthcare services", through setting up AIIMS Delhi-like institutions and upgrading government medical colleges. Establishing an AIIMS in West Bengal was proposed in 2012 as part of the 12th Five-Year Plan, with the original location proposed being Raiganj,  from the capital Kolkata, but by June 2014, the proposed location was changed to Kalyani, only  from the capital. In March 2015, the union cabinet gave an official approval for the location, on a 150-acre lot in the village Basantapur, near Kalyani.

The construction of the institute started in 2016, with a target completion date of March 2020.  The mentoring institution is AIIMS Bhubaneswar, the first director appointed was Dipika Deka and Chitra Sarkar selected as president. Deka resigned in May 2019, leaving the director's position open. In March 2020, Ramji Singh was appointed as new director.

Campuses
The permanent  campus of AIIMS Kalyani is under construction, with an expected completion date in October 2020. Temporarily, classes of the first batch were taken at the College of Medicine & JNM Hospital campus in Kalyani, while students are already staying at the hostel on campus. An outpatient department (OPD) at the permanent campus was started on 27 January 2021.

Academics
The institute became operational with the first batch of 50 MBBS students, which started in September 2019, one of the six AIIMSs to become operational in 2019.
In 2020 the number of seats was increased from 50 to 125.

On 1 March 2022, first Academic season of B.Sc(Nursing) course with 60 number of seats capacity inaugurated by institute president.

References

External links

Hospitals in West Bengal
Medical colleges in West Bengal
Educational institutions established in 2019
Hospitals established in 2019
2019 establishments in West Bengal
Kalyani
Kalyani, West Bengal